{{DISPLAYTITLE:C11H16BrNO3}}
The molecular formula C11H16BrNO3 (molar mass: 290.153 g/mol) may refer to:

 2-Bromomescaline (2-Br-M)
 BOB (psychedelic), or 4-bromo-2,5,beta-trimethoxyphenethylamine

Molecular formulas